ICDP may refer to

 International Confederation for Disarmament and Peace
 Integrated Conservation and Development Project
 International Continental Scientific Drilling Program
 Institut de Criminologie et de Droit Pénal de Paris